K. E. Radhakrishna (born 22 Dec 1946) an Indian educationalist, writer, playwright, musicologist, columnist and political leader. He holds an M.A. in English Literature and LLB from Bangalore University.

Early and family life

Prof Radhakrishna is a Hindu Brahmin born to a poor agricultural family in the village of Peraje, Dakshina Kannada district in Karnataka, to parents Eshwarappiah (father) and Kaveramma (mother). After his initial schooling
in Dakshina Kannada, he obtained his BA degree in RPD college in Belagavi, MA in English Literature in Central College, Bangalore and LLB from Bangalore University. His wife, Ramadevi Radhakrishna, is a sociology professor at BSVP College for Women in Bangalore. His son Dr. Raghu Vikram serves as a Professor of Radiology in M.D. Anderson Hospital, Houston, Texas, USA and daughter Ashwini Radhakrishna is a Director of a software company in San Diego, California, USA. Varshavikram, Nayan, Gowri and Madhav are his grandchildren.

As a Professor
In 1972, he joined as a lecturer in English Literature in Seshadripuram College, Bangalore. In 1987, he became the youngest professor in the Department of Collegiate Education. He became principal of Seshadripuram college in 1988, a post he held till 2002 when he took Voluntary retirement and joined Surana College, Bangalore as the Principal.

Beginning career as a teacher in English at Sheshadripuram College, he
became the youngest professor in collegiate education and adored the principalship of the
college for 20 years and later as the principal of Surana College. He has the distinction of
being one the longest-standing principals of the degree colleges in India. He is an institution
builder and institution by himself.
In 2007, he left Surana college and started the Sa-Mudra foundation and currently serves as its managing director. He also assisted in the founding of YUVA helpline, a 24-hour counselling service for distressed students.
Nationally he has been a Member of Expert Committee-University Grants Commission, Peer Committee-National Assessment and Accreditation Council (NAAC), Joint Consultative Committee, High Power Committee-Higher Educational Policies, In-house Committee-Higher Education, Coordinating Secretary-Think Tank of Collegiate Education, Government of Karnataka.
Bangalore Management Association and National Institute of Personnel Management
He has been the past president, Indian Colleges Forum, New Delhi, Federation of Karnataka State Principals' Association and Professionals Action Committee for Educational Reforms (PACER).
Prof.K.E. Radhakrishna has held various key positions spread over the entire canvas
of education and related fields during the last three decades, as the National President of
Indian Colleges Forum – as President of Federation of Principals Association of Karnataka
and held almost all positions of importance in the Bangalore University as a member of
Syndicate, Academic Council, Board of Studies, Chairman of Board of Examiners and expert
Committees of University Grants Commission – New Delhi. He served as a member of the
Syndicates of Bangalore, Mangalore and Bijapur Universities and the Sanskrit University, Karnataka.

Public life
Prof. K.E. Radhakrishna is one of the very well-known Educationists and Social/Public
Activists not only in Karnataka, but all over India and an important writer both in Kannada and
English. He is a very well-known Public Personality of Karnataka.

Prof. Radhakrishna was a Member of the General Council of National Assessment &
Accreditation Council and Member of the Academic Advisory Board, NAAC nominated by the
University Grants Commission.
Prof. K.E Radhakrishna was active since his student days. He was the President of
Bangalore University Students Council (During 1969-70 – the Prestigious Central College
Bangalore). 
He has presented his ideas to several academic meetings held both nationally and internationally including Rio-de-Janeiro, Brazil; Cincinnati, USA; San Diego – California USA etc.
He has attended and presented in several International Conferences such as International Kannada Conference held at Manchester, U.K and Baltimore USA; Commonwealth Legal Educators Conference, 'University Management systems' Maryland University 1995 at City Polytechnic of Hong Kong.
He is a regular speaker in All India Radio, Doordarshan and a regular columnist writing for several Kannada dailys such as Mungaru, Janavahini  Samyukta Karnataka etc., and has written for Daily News & Analysis.

Involvement in Culture

Prof. Radhakrishna is a keen promoter and lover of Art and Culture. Himself being a
Yakshagana and theatre artist, he served Karnataka Sangeetha Nritya Academy as a
member and he is associated with many cultural forums of Bangalore. He was the executive
committee member of South Zone Cultural center – Tanjavore. His poetic work Gopikonmada has been adopted and found repeated performances as a Dance Ballet and into Yakshagana.

He is also a well-known Poet, and Writer both in Kannada and English. He is a regular
and Long-standing columnist in Kannada continuously writing a Weekly column in Samyukta
Karnataka. He is a award-winning Tulu Writer, the second one to write in Shivalli Tulu Dialect.

As a writer
1. Kannakadu – Kavya Prabhandha (this book had won Attimobbe Prshasthi and Kannada Sahitya Pradhikara Prashasithi)

2. Gopikonmada – Poetry translated from Sanskrit this poem has come in the form of CD
Sung by several important artists of Karnataka and was presented as Dance Drama and popular in YouTube and Wynk. It is translated into music languages of Malayalam, Telugu, Tamil, Tulu, Hindi, Marathi and Bengali.

3. Prabhuthva Khathana (the Governance according to Ramanayana)

4. Bharithi Samudra – Poetry collection

5. Akashadalli Benki- Collection of articles

6. Aavarthamana

7. Jagatika-Chanduraya

8. VishwaGrama

9. Mugilagala

10.Kalaprasanga

11.Waree Nota

12.Maryade Mathu

13.Satyappe Balelu (A Collection of Tulu Short Stories as won the best book award 2012
from Karnataka Tulu Sahitya Academy) both in Kannada and Tulu

14. Pretham Bhattara Ninthilaru (A highly acclaimed novel in Kannada & Tulu)

Translations into Kannada
15. Nandan Nilekani's Imaging India As Bimba Bharatha

16. Jairam Ramesh's – Chindia

17. Indira Gandhi Life in Nature- as Indira Gandhi Prakriti Sangatya

18. Yaru Bharathamaate? Into Kannada (English by Purushottama Agarwal)

Translations into English
19. Jain Mahapurana- 7 Vol- 6000pages- 20000shlokas from Sanskrit to English
(Originally written by Bhagawath Jinasenacharya and Guna Bhadracharya in 16th century and translated into Kannada by Erturu Shantiraja Shastry into Kannada in 1927)

As an Editor
17.DVG – Baduku Baraha

18.Gopalakrishna Adiga – Anusandhana

19. Manjeshwara Govindapai – Samskriti Loka

20.Allamna –Anubhava

21.Pampaadhyayana

22.Kumarvysa Kathana

23.Lakmisha Kavya Vaibhava

24.Rathnakarvarni Iti-Vrutha

25.Reminiscences on Raja Rao and R.K.Narayan (English)

26.Jagannnatha Panditha

27.Anuhya

28.Bhaktikavya in Hindi

29.Aaloka

Awards

He has been awarded with Rajyotsava Award, a prestigious award honored by
Government of Karnataka, Guru Raghavenra Sadbhavana Prashasthi, Gorakanatha Prashahsthi DVG Puraskar for his contribution to literature. The Public Relations
Council of India has bestowed on him the National Chanikya Award for Education. He was
awarded Sandesha Prashasiti as Best Teacher. His students honored him with the title
‘Loka Mitra’ on the occasion of his 60th Birthday. Prof. Radhakrishna has
been awarded Honorary Doctorate by the Karnataka State Open University Mysore for
his contribution to Literature and Education.

He has been awarded several recognitions such as:
Kempegowda Prashasti' for serving the cause of education by the Bangalore City Corporation.
Bhargava Prashasti – For service in the field of education
'Eminent Educationist' – By Lions International
'Untiring academician'. Title given by "Technoworld" – a professional magazine.
'Samsa Award' for theatre by Karnataka Nataka Academy & Bharath Yatra Kendra
Udaya TV introduced and interviewed him under 'Parichay' Programme telecast in two episodes.
Indian Express interviewed him in 'Face to Face' and 'Profile'
DD-1 Chandana introduced him as an Eminent Educationist.
Govt. of Karnataka made a documentary on him titled Nelada Siri.

Political Activist
He is the Vice President of the Karnataka Pradesh Congress Party, the chairman of Media and Communication cell and the Manifesto Committee for 2013 Karnataka Assemble Elections.
He had contested as a JDS candidate from Bengaluru South Parliamentary Constituency and had lost to BJP stalwart Sri Anantakumar.  
He has held several important positions such as Member of Syndicate, Academic Council, Faculty of Arts and Board of Studies in English, Exam Review Committee, Sports Committee and College Development Council in Bangalore University. He is a member of Karnataka State Women's University Syndicate.

References

Living people
Politicians from Bangalore
Janata Dal (Secular) politicians
1946 births
Academic staff of Bangalore University
People from Dakshina Kannada district
Karnataka politicians